Ceraeochrysa smithi is a species of green lacewing in the family Chrysopidae. It is found in the Caribbean Sea, Central America, North America, and South America.

References

Further reading

 

Chrysopidae
Articles created by Qbugbot
Insects described in 1914